Tjvjik may refer to.

Tjvjik (food), an Armenian dish
Tjvjik, the classic story of the writer Atrpet
Tjvjik (film), a 1962 Soviet Armenian short film by Arman Manaryan